The 2021–22 II liga (also known as eWinner II liga due to sponsorship reasons) is the 74th season of the third tier domestic division in the Polish football league system since its establishment in 1948 and the 14th season of the Polish II liga under its current title. The league is operated by the Polish Football Association.

The league is contested by 18 teams. The regular season is played in a round-robin tournament. The season started on 30 July 2021 and will conclude on 22 May 2022 (regular season).

Teams
A total of 18 teams participate in the 2021–22 II liga season.

Changes from last season
The following teams have changed division since the 2020–21 season.

To II liga

From II liga

Stadiums and locations

Note: Table lists in alphabetical order.

League table

Positions by round
Note: The place taken by the team that played fewer matches than the opponents was underlined.

Results

Results by round

Promotion play-offs
II liga play-offs for the 2021–22 season will be played on 25 and 29 May 2022. The teams who finished in 3rd, 4th, 5th and 6th place are set to compete. The fixtures are determined by final league position – 3rd team of regular season vs 6th team of regular season and 4th team of regular season vs 5th team of regular season. The winner of final match will be promoted to the I liga for next season. All matches will be played in a stadiums of team which occupied higher position in regular season.

Season statistics

Top goalscorers

Number of teams by region

See also
 2021–22 Ekstraklasa
 2021–22 I liga
 2021–22 III liga
 2021–22 Polish Cup
 2021 Polish SuperCup

Notes

References

External links
  

2021-22
2021–22 in Polish football
Poland